Idgia is a genus of beetles in the family Prionoceridae. They are distributed within the Old World tropics. These elongated beetles have soft elytra. Males have a comb on the inner edge of the distal tarsal segment of the foreleg. 

Species that have been described in the genus include:
I. abdominalis 
I. abyssinica  
I. amplipennis 
I. andrewesi 
I. angustata  
I. apicalis 
I. apicata  
I. arabica  
I. ardesica  
I. assimilis 
I. asirensis 
I. atricornis 
I. bagorensis 
I. bakeri 
I. belli  
I. bimaculata   
I. caeruliventris 
I. cavilabris 
I. chloroptera 
I. cincta 
I. confusa 
I. costata 
I. costulata 
I. curticeps 
I. cyanea 
I. cyanocephala 
I. cyanipennis 
I. cyanura  
I. dasytoides 
I. decolor 
I. deusta  
I. dichroa 
I. dimelaena 
I. dimidiata 
I. diversiceps 
I. dohertyi 
I. dubia 
I. elongaticeps 
I. femorata 
I. flavibuccis 
I. flavicollis 
I. flavirostris  
I. flavithorax 
I. flavilabris 
I. flavolimbata 
I. foveifrons 
I. fruhstorferi 
I. fulvicollis 
I. geniculata 
I. gorhami 
I. grandis 
I. granulipennis  
I. griseolineata 
I. haemorrhoidalis 
I. hoffmanni 
I. huegeli 
I. humeralifer 
I. incerta 
I. indicola 
I. iriomoteana 
I. javana 
I. laticornis  
I. lineata 
I. longicollis 
I. longipalpis  
I. longipes 
I. longissima 
I. luteipes 
I. luzonica 
I. melanocephala 
I. maculicornis 
I. maculiventris 
I. maindroni 
I. major 
I. marginata 
I. mindanaosa 
I. melanura 
I. minuta 
I. moupinensis 
I. nilgirica 
I. nitida  
I. obscurimembris 
I. oculata  
I. oedemeroides 
I. opacipennis 
I. pallidicolor 
I. parlicularipes 
I. particularicornis 
I. plectrophora 
I. revoili 
I. rostrifera  
I. rouyeri 
I. semitecta 
I. stamperi 
I. subparallela 
I. terminata 
I. testaceipes 
I. thibetana 
I. uncigera 
I. ungulata  
I. varicornis 
I. varipes 
I. virescens  
I. viridivittata

References 

Insect genera
Prionoceridae